Boris Schommers (born 19 January 1979) is a German football manager who last managed 1. FC Kaiserslautern.

Career

1. FC Köln
Schommers has been working in 1. FC Köln's youth department since 2006. At the beginning of the 2010–11 season, he was appointed coach of the under-17 squad and led them to an Under 17 Bundesliga championship in his first year. He coached the team for two more seasons before taking over the under-19 squad in the 2013–14 season. In 2015, Schommers completed his UEFA Pro Licence.

1. FC Nürnberg
At the beginning of the 2017–18 2. Bundesliga season, Schommers was appointed as assistant manager under Michael Köllner at 1. FC Nürnberg. Together, they were promoted to the Bundesliga. After 21 matchdays in the 2018–19 season, the club was in last place with 12 points, which led to Köllner being sacked and Schommers taking over as interim coach. Under Schommers, the team gained 7 points until the 33rd matchday, which meant that they were assured of relegation one matchday before the end of the season. Before the last matchday, 1. FC Nürnberg announced that Schommers would leave the club at the end of the season. The club finally completed the season in last place with 19 points.

1. FC Kaiserslautern
On 19 September 2019, Schommers was appointed as manager of 3. Liga team 1. FC Kaiserslautern. He replaced Sascha Hildmann, who had been sacked after Kaiserslautern was only placed 14th with nine points after eight matchdays. He was sacked on 29 September 2020.

References

External links

1979 births
German football managers
2. Bundesliga managers
3. Liga managers
1. FC Nürnberg managers
1. FC Kaiserslautern managers
Living people
Sportspeople from Leverkusen